Cognitive is the debut studio album by Swedish progressive metal/rock band Soen, released on 15 February 2012 via Spinefarm Records.

Track listing

Credits
 Joel Ekelöf – vocals
 Joakim Platbarzdis – guitar
 Steve DiGiorgio – bass guitar
 Martin Lopez – drums

Production
 Joakim Platbarzdis – production
 Martin Lopez – co-production
 David Bottrill – engineering, mixing
 João Carvalho – mastering
 Ben Tolman – artwork

References

2012 debut albums
Soen albums